El usurero, is a 1969 Mexican telenovela produced by Televisa and originally transmitted by Telesistema Mexicano.

Cast 
Luis Bayardo
Alejandro Ciangherotti
Andrea Cotto
Carlos Fernández

References

External links 

Mexican telenovelas
Televisa telenovelas
Spanish-language telenovelas
1969 telenovelas
1969 Mexican television series debuts
1969 Mexican television series endings